Riyeh (also Romanized as Rīyeh and Reyeh) is a village in Meymanat Rural District of Golestan District of Baharestan County, Tehran province, Iran. At the 2006 National Census, its population was 972 in 244 households, when it was in Robat Karim County. The following census in 2011 counted 1,430 people in 371 households, by which time the district, together with Bostan District, had been separated from the county and Baharestan County established. The latest census in 2016 showed a population of 1,532 people in 428 households.

References 

Baharestan County

Populated places in Tehran Province

Populated places in Baharestan County